Alessandro Rossi (1555–1615) was a Roman Catholic prelate who served as Bishop of Parma (1614–1615)
and Bishop of Castro del Lazio (1611–1614).

Biography
Alessandro Rossi was born in 1555.
On 31 January 1611, he was appointed during the papacy of Pope Paul V as Bishop of Castro del Lazio.
On 24 February 1611, he was consecrated bishop by Carlo Conti (cardinal), Bishop of Ancona e Numana, with Alessandro Guidiccioni (iuniore), Bishop of Lucca, and Giovanni Ambrogio Caccia, Bishop Emeritus of Castro del Lazio, serving as co-consecrators. 
On 9 July 1614, he was appointed during the papacy of Pope Paul V as Bishop of Parma.
He served as Bishop of Parma until his death on 24 March 1615.

References

External links and additional sources
 (for Chronology of Bishops) 
 (for Chronology of Bishops) 
 (for Chronology of Bishops) 
 (for Chronology of Bishops) 

17th-century Italian Roman Catholic bishops
Bishops appointed by Pope Paul V
1555 births
1615 deaths